The Cleveland Browns relocation controversy—colloquially called "The Move" by fans—was caused during the 1995 NFL season by the announcement from then-Browns owner Art Modell that he intended to move the Cleveland Browns of the National Football League from its long-time home of Cleveland to Baltimore.

Subsequent legal actions by the city of Cleveland and Browns season ticket holders led the NFL to broker a compromise in which Modell agreed to return the Browns franchise to the league. The agreement explicitly stipulated that the Browns franchise, including its history, records and intellectual property, were to remain in Cleveland. In exchange, the NFL agreed to grant Modell a new franchise in Baltimore (which was eventually named the Ravens) while the City of Cleveland agreed to build an NFL-caliber venue to replace the aging Cleveland Stadium. As a result, Cleveland Stadium was demolished beginning in late 1996 and a new stadium was constructed on the same site.

Since it was deemed infeasible for the Browns to play the 1996 season in Cleveland under such circumstances, the franchise was officially deactivated by the NFL in February 1996. In lieu of holding both a dispersal draft for the Browns and an expansion draft for the Ravens, the NFL allowed Modell to effectively transfer the Browns' existing football organization to the Ravens. By 1998, the NFL had ruled out moving any of the league's then-30 teams to Cleveland in order to avoid even more controversy (and by extension committed to stocking the roster of a 31st team with an expansion draft) and sold the Browns franchise to Al Lerner, a former minority owner of the franchise under Modell, for $530 million. The re-activated Browns acquired players through this expansion draft and resumed play in 1999.

This compromise, which was unprecedented in North American professional sports at the time, has since been cited in franchise moves and agreements in other leagues, including ones in Major League Baseball, Major League Soccer, the National Basketball Association, and the National Hockey League.

Dissatisfaction with Cleveland Stadium

In 1975, knowing that Municipal Stadium was costing the city over $300,000 annually to operate, then-Browns owner Art Modell signed a 25-year lease in which he agreed to incur these expenses in exchange for: quasi-ownership of the stadium, a portion of his annual profits, and capital improvements to the stadium at his expense. Modell's new company, Stadium Corporation, paid the city annual rents of $150,000 for the first five years and $200,000 afterwards.

Modell had originally promised never to move the Browns. He had publicly criticized the Baltimore Colts' move to Indianapolis, and had testified in favor of the NFL in court cases where the league unsuccessfully tried to stop Al Davis from moving the Oakland Raiders to Los Angeles. However, Modell refused to share suite revenue with the Cleveland Indians, who also played at Cleveland Stadium at that time, even though much of the revenues were generated during baseball games.

In 1990, voters approved a ballot measure to build a new sports complex, the Gateway Sports and Entertainment Complex, which included a new baseball-only stadium and an arena. Modell, believing that his revenues were not endangered, decided not to participate in the Gateway Project that built Jacobs Field for the Indians and Gund Arena for the Cleveland Cavaliers. Modell's assumptions proved incorrect, and Stadium Corporation's suite revenues declined sharply when the Indians moved to Jacobs Field in 1994. Soaring player salaries put additional financial pressure on the Browns' owner. Modell claimed to have lost $21 million between 1993 and 1994.

Financial considerations
Due to the massive and relatively consistent increase in the value of NFL franchises since the league's founding in 1920, the league has a long history of owners whose net worth is largely accounted for by the value of their football teams. Even today, many of the league's clubs are owned by businesspeople (or their heirs) who, while relatively well-off by the standards of the time, founded or purchased a football team which has since appreciated in value at a far higher rate than whatever other business interests they might have originally been involved in. However, even with those considerations in mind, Modell's net worth had always been relatively meager compared to most other principal owners in the NFL, despite his longstanding influence in league circles.

The Browns' capitalization problems were systemic and dated back to their founding as a charter All-America Football Conference franchise by legendary coach Paul Brown. Modell was initially recruited in large part because the NFL was desperate to avoid any perception of franchise instability within its ranks, especially in the face of competition with the then-fledgling (but well-financed) American Football League. As Cleveland had been decisive in ensuring the AAFC's relative success and eventual partial merger with the older league, the NFL was keen not to lose the market once again to yet another rival league in the way it had in 1946 when it allowed the Cleveland Rams to move to Los Angeles.

Modell's purchase of the team was ultimately approved by the NFL under conditions that the league might otherwise have rejected. It was among the most heavily leveraged purchases in league history, as most of the funds used to purchase the team were borrowed. Modell spent most of the next 34 years in financial difficulty, especially as interest rates soared and the costs of operating an NFL team escalated with the value of the league's franchises. This led Modell to take legally questionable measures to remain solvent. For example, he tried to transfer liability for several personal bad loans to the Browns organization, prompting one of his minority partners to sue him. As early as 1983, Modell concluded that he would never be able to pay all of his debts before his deal with the city expired. The loss of revenue from the Indians hit Modell especially hard. After realizing how much revenue was lost from the Indians moving out of Cleveland Stadium, he requested a referendum be placed on the ballot to provide $175 million in taxes to refurbish the outmoded and declining Cleveland Stadium.

Announcing the move

On December 12, 1994, Modell told his board that he didn't believe a referendum to raise the sin tax would pass, as the proceeds would have been used to either fund a renovated Municipal Stadium or a new stadium. Modell then informed them that if the referendum failed, he would be finished in Cleveland, and would have no choice but to move the Browns.

Entering the 1995 season, the Browns, coached by Bill Belichick, were coming off a playoff season in which the team finished 11–5 and advanced to the second round of the playoffs.  Sports Illustrated predicted that the Browns would represent the AFC in Super Bowl XXX at the end of the season, and the team started 3–1, but they then lost their next three games.

While this was happening, Browns minority owner Al Lerner was privately prodding Modell to consider moving to Baltimore. He urged Modell to contact newly installed Maryland Stadium Authority chairman John Moag. Earlier in the year, the league had told Moag that Baltimore would get a team (either an expansion team or a relocated existing team) if a stadium were already in place.

Elected officials in Baltimore and Maryland were still smarting from the Colts moving to Indianapolis after the 1983 season, and refused to commit any money towards a new stadium unless the Stadium Authority secured a deal with a team. With this in mind, Moag made several calls to Modell that went ignored for much of 1995. Finally, in late July, Modell allowed Lerner to meet with Moag, provided that Lerner stress that Modell was not serious about moving. At that meeting, Moag laid out an offer in which the Browns would get the rights to a new, $220 million stadium if they moved to Baltimore. However, Moag told Lerner to take the offer back to Modell only if he was serious about considering a move.

Negotiations continued in secret until September, when Moag told Lerner that if the Browns were serious about moving, "you need to act and act now." A few days later, Lerner, Modell and Moag met at Lerner's Midtown Manhattan office. At that meeting, Moag presented a memorandum of understanding that was almost identical to what he'd offered the Cincinnati Bengals a few months earlier: a deal that ultimately led Cincinnati voters to pass a referendum that built what would become Paul Brown Stadium. Indeed, some paragraphs still referred to "Cincinnati" rather than "Cleveland." Modell still had some trepidation about the deal, but signed after Moag assured him that Baltimore fans would hail him as a hero.

Soon afterward, Modell told San Francisco 49ers president Carmen Policy that he was moving the Browns to Baltimore. Policy had been well aware that relations between Modell and Cleveland had become rather strained, and was secretly working with Pittsburgh Steelers owner Dan Rooney to keep the Browns in Cleveland. Policy urged Modell to sit down with NFL Commissioner Paul Tagliabue in hopes of resolving the situation, but Modell rejected it out of hand.

On November 6, 1995, with the team at 4–5, Modell announced in a press conference at Camden Yards that he had signed a deal to move the Browns to Baltimore for the 1996 season. Modell said he felt the city of Cleveland did not have the funding nor political will to build a first-class stadium. The very next day, on November 7, Cleveland voters overwhelmingly approved the aforementioned tax issue to remodel Cleveland Stadium.

Despite this, Modell ruled out a reversal of his decision, maintaining publicly that his relationship with Cleveland had been irrevocably severed. "The bridge is down, burned, disappeared", he said. "There's not even a canoe there for me." In truth, Modell had been brought to tears when he signed the memorandum of understanding in September: he had even told Moag that signing it was "the hardest thing I've ever done" and meant "the end of our life in Cleveland." Years later, longtime Browns general counsel Jim Bailey told The Athletic that Modell was "an emotional wreck" when he signed the memorandum.

Initial reaction
The City of Cleveland sued Modell, the Browns, Stadium Corp, the Maryland Stadium Authority, and the authority's director, John A. Moag Jr., in City of Cleveland v. Cleveland Browns, et al., Cuyahoga County Court of Common Pleas Case No. CV-95-297833, for breaching the Browns' lease, which required the team to play its home games at Cleveland Stadium for several years beyond 1995, filing an injunction to keep the Browns in the city until at least 1998. Several other lawsuits were filed by fans and ticket holders. The United States Congress even held hearings on the matter.

Actor/comedian Drew Carey returned to his hometown of Cleveland on November 26, 1995, to host "Fan Jam" in protest of the proposed move. A protest was held in Pittsburgh during the Browns' game there against the Pittsburgh Steelers, but ABC, the network broadcasting the game (and also the home of Carey's new sitcom that had just premiered), declined to cover or mention the protest. That game was one of the few instances that Steelers fans and Browns fans were supportive of each other, as fans in Pittsburgh felt that Modell was robbing their team of their long-standing rivalry with the Browns. Browns fans reacted with anger to the news, wearing hats and T-shirts that read "Muck Fodell".

On the field, the Browns stumbled to finish 5–11 after the announcement, ahead of only the expansion Jacksonville Jaguars, to whom they lost twice, in the AFC Central, becoming the first team in the NFL's modern era to lose twice to a first-year expansion team. Virtually all of the team's sponsors pulled their support, leaving Cleveland Stadium devoid of advertising during the team's final weeks.  After the announcement, the team lost all their home games except the final, in which they defeated the Cincinnati Bengals 26–10. The game itself was blacked out on television locally on WKYC, but NBC did broadcast extensive pregame coverage from Cleveland.

Settlement
After extensive talks between the NFL, the Browns, and officials of the two cities, Cleveland accepted a legal settlement that would keep the Browns legacy in Cleveland.

While a number of parties had already expressed interest in acquiring the Browns by this point, it soon became clear that no viable owner would be ready to operate a football team on such short notice; even without that to consider, the NFL had insisted on the replacement of Cleveland Stadium, whereas the city had no other venue that met NFL requirements for even temporary use.

Thus, on February 9, 1996, the NFL announced that the Browns franchise would be 'deactivated' for three years, and that a new stadium would be built for a new Browns team, as either an expansion team or a team relocated from another city, that would begin play in 1999, while in exchange Modell would be granted a new franchise - the 31st NFL franchise - for Baltimore.

Modell was permitted to retain the current contracts of players and other football personnel (although notably, Belichick was fired and replaced by Ted Marchibroda) while the name of his holding company was changed from Cleveland Browns, Inc. to Baltimore Ravens, Inc. Modell is thus typically reckoned to have moved the football organization, but not the franchise itself. The settlement stipulated that the reactivated team for Cleveland would retain the Browns' name, colors, history, records, awards, and archives.

The settlement was approved by league owners after a 25–2 vote, with three abstentions. The two "no" votes were from Ralph Wilson of Buffalo and Dan Rooney of Pittsburgh. The three abstentions were from the owners whose teams at the time had most recently re-located (the Cardinals, Raiders and Rams), thus notably including Raiders' owner Al Davis who had earlier publicly clashed with Modell regarding franchise moves.

An additional stipulation was that in any future realignment plan, the Browns would be placed in a division with the Pittsburgh Steelers and Cincinnati Bengals due to long-standing rivalries with those two teams. Upon their reactivation in 1999, the Browns were placed back in the AFC Central with the Steelers and Bengals, as well as the Ravens, Titans, and Jaguars: this arrangement put teams from Baltimore, Cleveland and Pittsburgh in the same division for the first time in NFL history.

When the NFL realigned into divisions of four teams for the 2002 season, Cleveland, Pittsburgh, Cincinnati, and Baltimore remained together in the new AFC North, while Tennessee, Jacksonville, Indianapolis (from the AFC East), and the expansion team, Houston Texans were placed in the new AFC South.

The only other active NFL team to temporarily suspend operations without merging with any other was Cleveland's previous NFL team, the Rams, during the 1943 season at the height of World War II.

Aftermath and legacy
The return of the NFL to Baltimore compelled the departure of the professional football team already in Baltimore at the time, the Grey Cup champion Baltimore Stallions of the Canadian Football League (CFL). Although they had drawn respectable fan support during their two seasons in Baltimore, Stallions owner Jim Speros knew his team could not compete with an NFL team and opted to re-establish the Montreal Alouettes. They subsequently assumed the name and history of the team that previously played in the city, the Alouettes, who had ceased operations just days before the start of the 1987 season.

Focus groups, a telephone survey, and a fan contest were all held to help select a new name for Modell's team. Starting with a list of over 100 possible names, the team's management reduced it to 17. From there, focus groups of a total of 200 Baltimore area residents reduced the list of names to six, and then a phone survey of 1000 people trimmed it down to three, Marauders, Americans, and Ravens. Finally, a fan contest drawing 33,288 voters picked "Ravens", a name that alludes to the famous poem, "The Raven", by Edgar Allan Poe, who spent the latter part of his life in Baltimore, and is buried there. The team also adopted purple and black as their team colors, a stark contrast to the brown and orange colors of the Browns. The former Colts Marching Band, which remained in Baltimore after the Colts moved to Indianapolis, was subsequently renamed the Baltimore's Marching Ravens. Along with the Washington Commanders, the Ravens are one of only two NFL teams with an official marching band.

Modell's move to Baltimore came amid an unprecedented flurry of similar threats — and actual moves — that fueled 12 new stadiums throughout the NFL. The Seahawks, Buccaneers, Bengals, Lions, Cardinals, and Bears used the threat of moving to coerce their respective cities to build new stadiums with public funds. Modell's team was one of four that actually moved between 1995 and 1997: Los Angeles lost both of its teams for the 1995 season, as the Raiders moved back to Oakland and the Rams moved east to St. Louis (the Rams would later move back to Los Angeles in 2016); and the Houston Oilers moved to Tennessee in 1997, where they became the Tennessee Titans two years later.

As with all other relocations, NFL football continued to air on local television in Cleveland due to the league's television contracts. During the three years the Browns suspended operations, the NFL ordered its broadcast partners to air games featuring the Browns' two biggest rivals, the Bengals and Steelers, on Cleveland's local stations. Two official secondary markets the Browns share with another team--Columbus and Youngstown—both primarily aired games from the teams the Browns shared those markets with, with Columbus airing Bengals games and Youngstown airing Steelers games. Erie, Pennsylvania, which is officially a secondary market for the Buffalo Bills but airs many Browns games due to Erie's close proximity to Cleveland, aired more Bills home games as well as Steelers games whenever it didn't come in conflict with the Bills away schedule.

After several NFL teams threatened to move to Cleveland to become the reactivated Browns (most notably the Tampa Bay Buccaneers), the NFL decided in 1998 to make the reactivated Browns an expansion team; while temporarily giving the league an odd number of teams (causing at least one team to be off in each of the 17 weeks of the NFL season from 1999–2001), this also eliminated any possibility of an existing franchise giving up its own identity for the Browns and thus prevented more lawsuits. In an ironic twist, Al Lerner—who helped Modell move to Baltimore—was granted ownership of the reactivated Browns; his son Randy took over ownership after Al's death in 2002 before selling the team to Pilot Flying J CEO Jimmy Haslam in 2012.

From its beginning, the odd number of teams and the ensuing awkward scheduling was considered a temporary arrangement pending the addition of a 32nd NFL franchise. Although Los Angeles was heavily favored, it was ultimately Houston that was awarded the league's 32nd team for the 2002 NFL season. The 2002 expansion led to a major re-alignment of the NFL into eight four-team divisions. The Jaguars and Titans joined the Texans in the new AFC South along with the Colts, Baltimore's former team, who moved from the AFC East. The Browns and Ravens' division was rebranded as the AFC North. Finally, to keep the conferences equal in size, the Seattle Seahawks (who had played their inaugural season in the National Football Conference) moved from the AFC West to the NFC West.

Following Houston's return to the NFL, Los Angeles became the favored destination for owners threatening to move their teams until the St. Louis Rams finally returned to Los Angeles for the 2016 season, followed by the San Diego Chargers (who had previously called L.A. home in the early days of the American Football League) one year later.

Two of the players from the Browns' 1995 roster returned to Cleveland in 1999. They were Antonio Langham, who spent the 1998 season with the San Francisco 49ers and was claimed by the Browns in the expansion draft, and Orlando Brown, who played for Baltimore until 1998 and signed with Cleveland as a free agent. Each player would play only the 1999 season in Cleveland. They were ultimately the only two players to play for the Browns under both the Modell and Lerner organizations.

The reactivated Browns have had only three winning seasons since returning to the NFL in 1999, with records of 9–7 in 2002, 10–6 in 2007, and 11–5 in 2020, earning wild card berths in the playoffs in 2002 and 2020. Meanwhile, the Ravens have been more successful, reaching the playoffs 13 times since 2000 and winning Super Bowl XXXV and Super Bowl XLVII, to the dismay of Browns fans. Longtime placekicker Matt Stover was the last remaining Ravens player that played for the Modell-owned Browns—he departed the Ravens following the 2008 season when the team chose not to re-sign him, finishing his career with the Indianapolis Colts. General manager and former Browns tight end Ozzie Newsome (who was in a front-office role under Modell in Cleveland) remained with the Ravens until his retirement in 2018.

The move would also have an effect in Pittsburgh. Steelers owner Dan Rooney was one of two owners (alongside Ralph Wilson of the Bills) to oppose Modell's move to Baltimore because of a mutual respect for the team and the fans. Because of the move, the Browns–Steelers rivalry, arguably one of the most heated rivalries in the NFL, has somewhat cooled in Pittsburgh due to the new Browns' lack of success. The Steelers–Ravens rivalry is considered the spiritual successor by fans in Pittsburgh and is one of the most heated current rivalries in the NFL. Since returning to the NFL, the Browns and Steelers rivalry has been largely one-sided in favor of Pittsburgh; although the rivalry is not as intense in Pittsburgh, Browns fans still consider it their top rivalry despite the Browns' recent struggles against the Steelers. However, the rivalry began to heat up on the Pittsburgh side when the Browns defeated the Steelers 48-37 in the 2020 Wild Card playoff round.

Modell continued to struggle financially even after the move. Like several other owners who had acquired their teams prior to the AFL-NFL merger Modell's net worth by the end of his tenure was primarily derived from the appreciation of his team's value, and he had relatively little outside wealth to help underwrite his club's expenses. Because of such continual financial hardships, the NFL directed Modell to initiate the sale of his franchise. On March 27, 2000, NFL owners approved the sale of 49 percent of the Ravens to Steve Bisciotti. In the deal, Bisciotti had an option to purchase the remaining 51 percent for $325 million in 2004 from Art Modell. On April 8, 2004, the NFL approved Steve Bisciotti's purchase of the majority stake in the club.

Although Modell later retired and had relinquished control of the Ravens, he is still despised in Cleveland, not only for moving the Browns, but also for his firing of head coach Paul Brown (who eventually founded the future arch-rival Bengals in 1968) in 1963. Some consider the Browns' move and subsequent lawsuits as having cost Modell a spot in the Pro Football Hall of Fame, which is in Canton, Ohio, 60 miles south of Cleveland and part of the Cleveland television market and Browns' territorial rights. Modell died in 2012, having never returned to Cleveland. The Browns were the only home team that did not acknowledge, much less commemorate, Modell's death the following Sunday. The team opted not to do so at the request of David Modell, who feared that the announcement would be met with anger by Browns fans still upset about the move.

Effect on teams in other sports leagues

Major League Baseball
The Minnesota Twins, when they signed their deal with Hennepin County, Minnesota for Target Field in 2006, agreed to a provision that was signed into law, allowing the state of Minnesota the right of first refusal to buy the team if it is ever sold. Also, it requires that the name, colors, World Series trophies, and history of the team remain in Minnesota if the Twins are ever moved out of the state. The deal is similar to what Modell agreed to with the city of Cleveland during the move.

Major League Soccer
In December 2005, the San Jose Earthquakes moved to Houston to become the Houston Dynamo. At the time, it was announced by the league that while players and staff would move with the team, the team name, colors, logo, and records (including two championship trophies) would stay in San Jose for when a new expansion team arrived. In 2008, the Earthquakes returned under the ownership of Lew Wolff.
The Browns move in 1995 had a direct effect on a proposed move of the Columbus Crew SC to Austin, Texas; the Modell Law, which was implemented in Ohio in 1996, prohibits sports teams that benefited from public facilities or financial assistance from moving to another city without a six-month notice and an attempt to sell the team to a local ownership group. A lawsuit was filed by Ohio Attorney General Mike DeWine and the city of Columbus. Rather ironically, Cleveland Browns owner Jimmy and Dee Haslam, along with other investors, offered to buy the Columbus Crew to keep them in Columbus. The deal sold the operational rights of the Crew to the Haslams, while previous Crew owner Anthony Precourt kept his equity stake in MLS, and was granted ownership of a new franchise in Austin. The sale of the Crew to Haslam's ownership group was announced as agreed to on December 28, 2018, and was completed in January 2019. As part of the deal, the lawsuit against Precourt was dismissed that day; the Modell Law remains untested as a result.

National Hockey League
After the Quebec Nordiques moved to Denver in 1995 to become the Colorado Avalanche, the franchise's retired numbers, name, logos, and historical stats remained in Quebec City and are expected to be used by any future Quebec City NHL franchise that may be established or move there. Upon arrival at Denver, the Nordiques' retired numbers were placed back into circulation.
In 2011, a team took the name of a city's previous team (as the Baltimore Stallions did when the Ravens forced their move to Montreal). That saga began in 1996, when the Winnipeg Jets left Manitoba for Phoenix, Arizona, and become the Phoenix (later Arizona) Coyotes. Thirteen years later, the Coyotes went bankrupt and were taken over by the league. Winnipeg-based True North Sports & Entertainment offered to buy the team and return it to Winnipeg, where it presumably would have re-assumed the Jets' name and history. The NHL turned down that proposal — they were still looking for an owner to operate the franchise in Phoenix, whose municipal government had agreed to subsidize the team's financial losses — but said that moving the team back to Winnipeg was their preferred backup option. But when the Atlanta Thrashers came up for sale a year later, the league decided that there was no chance of finding an owner to operate a franchise in Georgia, so they arranged for True North to purchase the Atlanta franchise and move it to Winnipeg for the  NHL season. The league decided to let True North and the new Jets use the identity of the old Winnipeg team, but not its history, which remained in Arizona with the Coyotes. The new Jets organization highlighted this change by quickly re-issuing the team's #9 jersey — retired by the old Jets in honor of superstar Bobby Hull — to forward Evander Kane, who had worn the number in Atlanta. While the new Jets were unable to reclaim the franchise records of the original franchise from 1972 to 1996, they did reclaim its logos and trademarks; since 2016, the current franchise honored the original incarnation by wearing throwback jerseys and pay tribute to its iconic players by establishing the Winnipeg Jets Hall of Fame.

National Lacrosse League
 The Rochester Knighthawks of the National Lacrosse League were relocated to Halifax in the 2019 NLL season to become the Halifax Thunderbirds. The intellectual property of the Knighthawks was acquired by Terry Pegula in 2019 for the new team while the records were transferred to Halifax.

National Basketball Association
The Seattle SuperSonics' move to Oklahoma City in 2008 included an agreement that the SuperSonics' name, logo, colors, and history would all be left in Seattle. This also includes banners and trophies, which would be displayed in a museum until such time as a new franchise (expansion or relocation) is brought to Seattle to be hung from the rafters of its arena. The original franchise, now known as the Oklahoma City Thunder, will continue to keep the SuperSonics records, championships, and retired numbers, until a new SuperSonics franchise is brought to Seattle: in effect, both the Thunder and a potential new SuperSonics franchise would share the original SuperSonics history.
When the name change from Bobcats to Hornets became official in May 2014, it announced that the Hornets, Pelicans, and the NBA had reached an agreement that all history and records of the original Charlotte Hornets would be transferred to the revived Hornets: thus, the Hornets are now considered to have been established in 1988, suspended operations in 2002, and resumed play in 2004 (as the Bobcats, and changing their name back to the Hornets in 2014), while the Pelicans are now considered a 2002 expansion team.
In the middle of the 2016-17 NBA season, the Detroit Pistons organized a deal to move the team out of The Palace of Auburn Hills and into the new Little Caesars Arena in Downtown Detroit, which was to open the following season: the deal was successful, and the Pistons moved into the arena the following season. When they moved back downtown, Palace Sports and Entertainment (the organization that owns the Pistons) made an agreement similar to the Supersonic's deal: if the team were ever to move out of Detroit, the team's name, colors, history, and records, including the team's NBA championship trophies, would remain in Detroit. This also includes all records and history of the Pistons' former WNBA affiliate, the Detroit Shock (now the Dallas Wings), whose three WNBA trophies and all other records were already in possession of the Pistons at the time of the move to Detroit.

See also
 Relocation of professional sports teams
 Cleveland sports curse
 Browns–Ravens rivalry
 History of the Cleveland Browns
 History of the Baltimore Ravens

References

Further reading

External links
 Inside the Browns deal. A Los Angeles Times article on the Cleveland Browns' move.
  on The NFL on NBC pregame show.

National Football League controversies
Cleveland Browns
Baltimore Ravens
National Football League franchise relocations